The quadrangular membrane is a layer of submucosa. It contains the cuneiform cartilages. The membrane runs between the lateral aspects of the epiglottis and arytenoid cartilages on each side. The free inferior border of the quadrangular membrane is the vestibular ligament which is the vestibular fold when covered by mucosa.  The superior border is in the aryepiglottic fold.

References

External links
 

Human head and neck